Mrauk-U Township is a township of Mrauk-U District in the Rakhine State of Myanmar. The principal town is Mrauk-U.

Townships of Rakhine State